Brihaspathi  is a 2018 Indian Kannada-language comedy drama film directed by Nanda Kishore and produced by Rockline Venkatesh under his home banner. The film stars Manoranjan Ravichandran, Mishti Chakraborthy, while Saikumar, Kanika Mann, Sithara, Sadhu Kokila, Avinash and Taarak Ponannappa play supporting roles.

The film's album and score were composed by V. Harikrishna. The film's cinematography is by Satya Hegde whilst the editing is done by K. M. Prakash. The filming commenced in early 2017 and underwent the title change twice during the making. The earlier titles chosen were Vrutti Illada Padavidhara  and Son of Ravichandran. The movie is a remake of the Tamil movie Velaiilla Pattadhari.

Plot

Sudhir, a graduate who is unemployed for several years, finally lands a job by overcoming various obstacles.

Cast
 Manoranjan Ravichandran as Sudhir
 Mishti Chakraborthy as Shalini
 Saikumar as Sudhir's father
 Kanika Mann
 Sithara as Sudhir's mother
 G.Muni Prasanna as Government Officer
 Avinash
 Sadhu Kokila
 Taarak Ponnannappa
 Prakash Belawadi

Production

In April 2016, it was reported that after having watched the success of actor Dhanush's Tamil films Velaiilla Pattadhari and Visaranai, producer Rockline Venkatesh bought its remake rights in Kannada from Dhanush's Wunderbar Films and chose director Nanda Kishore to lead the former film. In August 2016, actor V. Ravichandran's son Manoranjan Ravichandran was selected to play the lead role even before his first film Saheba released. It was reported that actress Amala Paul would reprise her role Shalini in Kannada version as well. However, it was later reported that actress Rachita Ram was chosen for the same role. Finally, Bollywood actress Mishti was finalized for the role which apparently made her excited since she considered herself to be an ardent fan of actor Dhanush. After the first schedule in Bengaluru, the team headed to Mysore to film a montage song and few sequences.

Soundtrack

V. Harikrishna has composed the soundtrack and background music for the film. The soundtrack album consists of six songs. Lyrics for the tracks were written by Yogaraj Bhat and Pradyumna Narahalli. The audio was released by the actor Jaggesh along with KFPA President Muniratna who is also the distributor of the film.

Release

The film released  on 5 January 2018 making it the first Kannada film released in the year 2018.

Reception

The Times of India" rated the film 3/5 and noted "Bruhaspati might not be VIP but it has its own charm with references to Rajkumar and Sudhir and other local analogies. This is a decent effort and one can watch it if you like films that are masala but not really over the top." Shyam Prasad S of Bangalore Mirror scored the film at 3 out of 5 stars and says There is a marked improvement in Manoranjan, even if much is still expected regarding the clarity of words he delivers. He sounds much like an unrefined Ravichandran. Nanda brings out a clinical perfection in executing this film. From the supporting cast to the behind-the-scene work by composer Harikrishna and cinematographer Satya Hegde, everyone seems to have followed the template to perfection.

References

External links
 
 Bruhaspati Movie - Manoranjan - Dir: Nanda Kishore - Rockline Productions - Jan 5th Release
  Bruhaspati (2018)

2018 films
2010s Kannada-language films
Unemployment in fiction
2018 masala films
Films scored by V. Harikrishna
Rockline Entertainments films
Indian comedy-drama films
Kannada remakes of Tamil films
Films directed by Nanda Kishore
2018 comedy-drama films